Taylor Michael Guilbeau (born May 12, 1993) is an American professional baseball relief pitcher who is currently a free agent. He has previously played in Major League Baseball (MLB) for the Seattle Mariners.

Career
Guilbeau was drafted out of Zachary High School in the 39th round by the New York Yankees in the 2011 Major League Baseball draft.

Washington Nationals
He did not sign, instead pitching for the Crimson Tide at the University of Alabama until he signed with the Washington Nationals after they drafted him in the 10th round in the 2015 draft.

After spending the 2018 season with the Class-A Advanced Potomac Nationals, Guilbeau was selected as one of the Nationals' representatives in the Arizona Fall League, where he pitched for the Salt River Rafters. Guilbeau showed a marked uptick in his fastball velocity in Arizona, hitting  at times. Guilbeau gave up a tenth-inning walkoff home run in the Arizona Fall League title game on November 17, 2018, to Atlanta Braves prospect Braxton Davidson.

Heading into the 2019 season, Guilbeau was ranked as the Nationals' 24th-best prospect by MLB Pipeline. He wasn't invited to major league spring training, but he was called over from minor league camp to pitch as the Nationals tuned up for the regular season. He was assigned to the Class-AA Harrisburg Senators for the season.

Seattle Mariners
On July 31, 2019, the Nationals traded Guilbeau, Aaron Fletcher, and Elvis Alvarado to the Seattle Mariners in exchange for Roenis Elías and Hunter Strickland. Following the trade, he was assigned to the Tacoma Rainiers.

On August 15, 2019, the Mariners selected Guilbeau's contract and promoted him to the major leagues. He made his major league debut on August 17 versus the Toronto Blue Jays.

Arizona Diamondbacks
On October 23, 2020, Guilbeau was claimed off waivers by the Arizona Diamondbacks. On February 6, 2021, Guilbeau was designated for assignment by Arizona after the signing of Joakim Soria was made official. On February 13, Guilbeau was outrighted and invited to Spring Training as a non-roster invitee. On April 23, 2021, Guilbeau was released by the Diamondbacks.

References

External links

1993 births
Living people
Baseball players from Baton Rouge, Louisiana
Major League Baseball pitchers
Seattle Mariners players
Alabama Crimson Tide baseball players
Gulf Coast Nationals players
Auburn Doubledays players
Hagerstown Suns players
Potomac Nationals players
Salt River Rafters players
Harrisburg Senators players
Fresno Grizzlies players
Tacoma Rainiers players